Sanicula arctopoides is a species of sanicle known commonly as footsteps of spring, bear's foot sanicle or yellow mats. It is a perennial herb found on the west coast of the United States and Canada, especially near the ocean. The branches are short and thick and may be prostrate or slightly erect. The leaves are yellowish-green and carrot-like or maple-shaped, and the tiny yellow flowers are borne in umbels with prominent bracts. The plants grow in low matted patches along the ground, resembling "footsteps" of yellow against the background.

This is a protected species in some areas.

External links
USDA Plants Profile for  Sanicula arctopoides
 Calflora: Sanicula arctopoides
Jepson Manual Treatment

arctopoides
Flora of British Columbia
Flora of California
Flora of the West Coast of the United States
Natural history of the California chaparral and woodlands
Flora without expected TNC conservation status